A Beautiful Day in the Neighborhood is a 2019 American biographical drama film on the TV presenter Fred Rogers, directed by Marielle Heller and written by Micah Fitzerman-Blue and Noah Harpster, inspired by the 1998 article "Can You Say... Hero?" by Tom Junod, published in Esquire. It stars Tom Hanks, Matthew Rhys, Susan Kelechi Watson, and Chris Cooper. It depicts Lloyd Vogel (Rhys), a troubled journalist for Esquire who is assigned to profile television icon Fred Rogers (Hanks).

The film premiered at the Toronto International Film Festival on September 7, 2019, and was theatrically released in the United States on November 22, 2019, by Sony Pictures Releasing. It grossed $68 million worldwide. Critics praised Hanks and Rhys's performances, Heller's direction, and its heart-warming messages. It was chosen by Time magazine as one of the ten best films of the year. For his performance, Hanks was nominated for Best Supporting Actor at the Academy Awards, as well as the Golden Globes, Critics' Choice, Screen Actors Guild Awards, and BAFTA Awards, among others.

Plot

In 1998, at the beginning of an episode of Mister Rogers' Neighborhood, Mr. Rogers displays a picture board with five doors. Three of the doors are opened to reveal the familiar faces of Lady Aberlin, King Friday, and Mr. McFeely. The fourth door is opened to reveal the face of Mr. Rogers' troubled new friend, Lloyd Vogel, who has a cut near his nose. Mr. Rogers explains that Lloyd has been hurt (and not necessarily on his face), and he is struggling to forgive the one who hurt him. After explaining what forgiveness means, Mr. Rogers leaves to visit Lloyd.

Lloyd Vogel is an Esquire journalist known for his cynical writing. He attends his sister Lorraine's wedding with his wife Andrea and their newborn son, Gavin. During the reception, Lloyd starts a fistfight with his estranged father, Jerry, over memories of Lloyd's deceased mother Lila, whom Jerry cheated on and abandoned, before being punched against the wall by another patron, explaining the cut by his nose.

Lloyd's editor, Ellen, assigns him to interview children's television presenter Fred Rogers for a 400-word article about heroes. Lloyd feels that the assignment is beneath him, but is informed that none of the other heroes were willing to talk to him. Still cynical, Lloyd questions whether Mister Rogers is "for real". Lloyd travels to the WQED studio in Pittsburgh to interview him. Rogers is dismissive of his fame and displays concern for Lloyd's nose injury. With coaxing, he relates some of the issues with his father, whose apology and attempt at reconciliation Lloyd has rebuffed. Rogers tells him his ways of dealing with anger, including striking the keys of a piano.

Determined to expose Rogers' friendly persona as an act, Lloyd watches several episodes of Rogers' show, but cannot discern anything. Interviewing Rogers again when he visits New York, seemingly dodging Lloyd's questions, he reminisces about raising his two sons. Fred takes out his puppets and asks Lloyd about his childhood rabbit stuffed animal and his father, provoking Lloyd into ending the interview.

Lloyd arrives home to find Jerry and his wife Dorothy talking with Andrea. He berates Jerry for cheating on his mother Lila, while she was dying of cancer. Ordering him to leave, Jerry suffers a heart attack and is transported to the hospital.

Lloyd refuses to remain overnight at the hospital with the rest of the family and returns to Pittsburgh to see Rogers. Exhausted, he collapses on the set of the Neighborhood of Make-Believe and dreams about his repressed childhood trauma. In his dream, Lloyd stumbles into an episode of Rogers' show about hospitals, finding himself wearing rabbit ears and shrunken to the size of Daniel Striped Tiger and King Friday XIII, while Rogers and Andrea tower over him. Lloyd also dreams about Lila, who urges him to release his anger.

Rogers and his wife, Joanne, bring Lloyd to their home to recuperate. The men later go to a restaurant, where Rogers asks Lloyd to spend one minute thinking about the people who "loved him into being", and encourages him to forgive Jerry.

Lloyd apologizes to Andrea for leaving her and Gavin at the hospital and visits Jerry and Dorothy at their home. He learns Jerry is dying of cardiac stenosis, and that is why Jerry attempted to reconnect with Lloyd. Lloyd forgives him, promises to be a better father, and writes an article about Rogers' impact on his life.

Lorraine, her husband Todd, and Rogers visit Jerry. Rogers asks Jerry to pray for him before he departs. Jerry dies shortly after Rogers' visit and Lloyd's 10,000-word article, "Can You Say... Hero?" is published as Esquires cover story.

At his studio, Rogers finishes the episode he was earlier working on, opening the fifth and final door on his picture board, revealing a picture of Lloyd happily reunited with his family. As the production ends, Mr. Rogers plays the piano alone, stops, strikes the keys angrily, and resumes playing.

Cast
 Matthew Rhys as Lloyd Vogel:A cynical journalist who is assigned to profile Fred Rogers for the magazine Esquire. Lloyd is based loosely on journalist Tom Junod, whose encounter with Rogers was adapted into the film. Director Marielle Heller described Lloyd as the viewer's "entry point into Fred's teachings" and expressed hope that Lloyd's character development and growth as a new father would compel viewers to reflect upon themselves.
 Tom Hanks as Fred Rogers:The creator and host of Mister Rogers' Neighborhood. To prepare for his role, Hanks visited the Fred Rogers Center at Saint Vincent College in Latrobe, Pennsylvania, for research in the Fred Rogers Archives and also watched Won't You Be My Neighbor?, a 2018 documentary film. At the 2019 Toronto International Film Festival, Hanks recalled watching "hundreds of hours" of footage of Rogers on set and behind the scenes in order to get into character. Heller noted that Rogers "doesn't have the dynamic nature you need for a protagonist for a movie" and considered him "the antagonist [...] who comes into someone's life and flips it upside down through his philosophy and the way he lived his life".
 Susan Kelechi Watson as Andrea Vogel:A public attorney, Lloyd's wife, and a fan of Rogers' show. Watson, herself a fan of Mister Rogers' Neighborhood, described her character as a "career woman" who faces unique challenges of patience and adaptation as the mother of a newborn.
 Chris Cooper as Jerry Vogel:Lloyd's estranged father and a philanderer who cheated on his dying wife Lila and abandoned Lloyd and Lorraine when they were children. In a press interview for the film, Cooper described his character as "multidimensional" and compared filming a scene with Hanks to seeing the "eyes of God".
 Maryann Plunkett as Joanne Rogers:Fred's wife. Plunkett met with Joanne Rogers to prepare for the role.
 Enrico Colantoni as Bill Isler:The President & CEO of Family Communications. In a radio interview, Colantoni said he became friends with the real Bill Isler while filming and described his character as having been "so important to Fred".
 Wendy Makkena as Dorothy Vogel:Jerry's second wife. Makkena described her character as part of Vogel's "dysfunctional, complicated family".
 Tammy Blanchard as Lorraine Vogel: Lloyd's sister and Todd's wife.
 Noah Harpster as Todd: Lorraine's husband and Lloyd's brother-in-law.
 Christine Lahti as Ellen: Lloyd's editor.

Additional cast members include Carmen Cusack as Margy, a producer of Mister Rogers' Neighborhood; Jessica Hecht as Lila Vogel, Lloyd's late mother and Jerry's ex-wife; Maddie Corman as Betty Aberlin, an actress starring as Lady Aberlin on Mister Rogers' Neighborhood; Daniel Krell as Mr. McFeely; and Jordan, Naomi, and Zoey Harsh as Gavin Vogel, Lloyd's son.

Notable cameos in the film include Rogers' wife Joanne, Mr. McFeely actor David Newell, Family Communications head Bill Isler, and Mister Rogers' Neighborhood producer Margy Whitmer who appear as customers in a restaurant that Rogers and Lloyd meet in. Arsenio Hall and Oprah Winfrey make uncredited appearances in archive footage of talk shows that Lloyd watches in the film, and Fred Rogers appears in archive footage of his show during the ending credits, singing the song "You've Got to Do It".

Production
On January 29, 2018, it was announced that Sony's TriStar Pictures had bought the worldwide distribution rights to the film You Are My Friend, a biographical film based on a 1998 Esquire magazine article about television personality Fred Rogers, who would be played by Tom Hanks. The script by Micah Fitzerman-Blue and Noah Harpster appeared on the 2013 Black List of best unproduced screenplays. It would be directed by Marielle Heller; its producers would be Big Beach's Marc Turtletaub and Peter Saraf along with Youree Henley.

In July 2018, Matthew Rhys signed to play journalist Lloyd Vogel, with production set to start in September 2018. Being Welsh, Rhys had never heard of Fred Rogers before he was offered the role. In August 2018, Chris Cooper was added to play Vogel's father; and in September, Susan Kelechi Watson was added. In October 2018, Enrico Colantoni, Maryann Plunkett, Tammy Blanchard, Wendy Makkena, Sakina Jaffrey, Carmen Cusack, Harpster and Maddie Corman joined the cast. In 2018, Nate Heller was chosen to score the film.

Principal photography began on September 10, 2018, in Pittsburgh, with several sets converted into New York City. Filming also took place in the Fred Rogers Studio at WQED (TV) where the late television host recorded Mister Rogers' Neighborhood, and at the Jewish Community Center in Squirrel Hill. The crew consulted with original crew members from Rogers' television series, and brought in the same cameras and monitors used in the original production. The film received tax credits of approximately $9.5 million against a production budget of $45 million for filming in Pittsburgh. Production wrapped on November 9, 2018.

On October 12, 2018, sound mixer James Emswiller had a heart attack and fell from a second-story balcony. He was taken to University of Pittsburgh Medical Center-Mercy, where he was pronounced dead.

The film's title was announced on December 27, 2018. The trailer was released on July 22, 2019.

Release
A Beautiful Day in the Neighborhood premiered at the Toronto International Film Festival on September 7, 2019. It was originally going to be released on October 18, 2019 by Sony Pictures Releasing, but in May 2018 was pushed back a month to November 22, 2019. It was released in China on September 18, 2020, after the country reopened theaters following COVID-19 pandemic lockdowns.

Home media
It was released by Sony Pictures Home Entertainment on Digital HD on February 4, 2020, and on Ultra HD Blu-ray, Blu-ray and DVD on February 18.

Reception

Box office
A Beautiful Day in the Neighborhood grossed $61.7 million in the United States and Canada, and $6.7 million in other territories, for a worldwide total of $68.4 million, against a production budget of $25 million.

In the United States and Canada, it was released alongside Frozen II and 21 Bridges, and was projected to gross around $15 million from 3,231 theaters in its opening weekend. It made $4.5 million on its first day, including $900,000 from Thursday night previews. It went on to debut to $13.3 million, finishing third at the box office. It fell just 11% in its second weekend, making $11.8 million and finishing fifth, and remained in fifth place the following weekend with $5.2 million.

Critical response

The website's critical consensus reads, "Much like the beloved TV personality that inspired it, A Beautiful Day in the Neighborhood offers a powerfully affecting message about acceptance and understanding." On Metacritic, the film has a weighted average score of 80 out of 100, based on 50 critics, indicating "generally favorable reviews". Audiences polled by CinemaScore gave the film an average grade of "A" on an A+ to F scale, while those at PostTrak gave it an average four out of five stars, with 66% saying they would definitely recommend it.

Steve Pond of TheWrap wrote: "A Beautiful Day in the Neighborhood finds a gentle state of grace and shows the courage and smarts to stay in that zone, never rushing things or playing for drama... But just as Mr. Rogers used his show to talk about big issues with children in a tone that was softer and more halting than you'd expect given the subject matter, so does Heller stick to understatement in a way that threatens to become dull or sappy but never does." Benjamin Lee of The Guardian wrote: "It's a given that Hanks will nab at least a best supporting actor nomination but it would be all too easy to forget his co-star. The cynic-becomes-a-believer arc is age old but it unfolds here without cliche thanks to an emotionally intelligent script from Noah Harpster and Micah Fitzerman-Blue, but mainly because of a marvelous, prickly turn from Rhys."

Armond White of the National Review was more critical: "Heller and screenwriters Micah Fitzerman-Blue and Noah Harpster don't show enough faith in Rogers' remedies—and not enough interest in their religious origins. In short, the movie seems wary of faith (it briefly mentions that Rogers was an ordained minister) and settles for secular sentimentality to account for his sensibility and behavior. This not only weakens the film, but it also hobbles Hanks's characterization."

Accolades

References

External links
 
 
 
 "Can You Say... Hero?", Esquire, November 1998

2019 biographical drama films
2019 films
American biographical drama films
Big Beach (company) films
Biographical films about journalists
Biographical films about people in arts occupations
Biographical films about writers
Drama films based on actual events
Esquire (magazine)
Films about Fred Rogers
Films about father–son relationships
Films about television people
Films based on newspaper and magazine articles
Films directed by Marielle Heller
Films set in Pittsburgh
Films set in New York City
Films set in New Jersey
Films set in 1998
Films shot in Pittsburgh
Tencent Pictures films
TriStar Pictures films
2019 drama films
2010s English-language films
2010s American films
English-language drama films